Tyseley railway station serves the district of Tyseley in Birmingham, West Midlands, England.

West Midlands Trains manages the station and runs most of the trains that serve it. Chiltern Railways trains serve the station in the late evening only.

The main station building is on a bridge over the tracks, on the Wharfedale Road (B4146). It is next to a railway depot and Tyseley Locomotive Works.

History
The Great Western Railway opened the station in 1906. It was built with four platforms, but later British Railways took platforms 1 and 2 out of use.

Since the mid-1990s traffic on the line has increased.

Services
Mondays to Saturdays, daytime service is generally two trains per hour outside peak hours.

Southbound, there is one train per hour to  via  and one train per hour to  via .

References

External links

Railway stations in Birmingham, West Midlands
DfT Category E stations
Former Great Western Railway stations
Railway stations in Great Britain opened in 1906
Railway stations served by Chiltern Railways
Railway stations served by West Midlands Trains